The Winter Cup is an annual winter gymnastics meet for elite artistic gymnasts of the United States.

History 
The first edition of the Winter Cup was held in 1997 and was initially a men's artistic gymnastics competition.  Women competed at the event for the first time in 2021.  The competition had a combined senior and junior field until 2018.

Past champions
Following is a list of past champions of the Winter Cup:

See also
American Cup
U.S. Classic
USA Gymnastics National Championships
Olympic Trials

References

External links
 Winter Cup official website

Artistic gymnastics competitions
Gymnastics competitions in the United States
Winter Cup